Oscar Lang Jr. was an American football, basketball, and baseball player as well as a coach.

University of Virginia
He was a prominent fullback for the Virginia Cavaliers football team of the University of Virginia.

1895
He was selected All-Southern in 1895.

Pro ball
He played with the Philadelphia All-Pro team.

Bucknell
In 1897 he played as a halfback for the Bucknell Bison.

Coaching career
He coached the Susquehanna University football eleven.

References

19th-century players of American football
American football fullbacks
American football halfbacks
Bucknell Bison football players
Conshohocken Athletic Club players
Latrobe Athletic Association players
Susquehanna River Hawks football coaches
Virginia Cavaliers football players
All-Southern college football players
Coaches of American football from Pennsylvania
Players of American football from Philadelphia